Estradiol benzoate/testosterone propionate (EB/TP), sold under the brand name Bothermon, is an injectable combination medication of estradiol benzoate (EB), an estrogen, and testosterone propionate (TP), an androgen/anabolic steroid. It contains 0.24 mg/mL EB and 4.76 mg/mL TP in oil solution in each ampoule and is administered by intramuscular injection. The medication was marketed in Japan by 1953 and remains available in this country today.

See also
 List of combined sex-hormonal preparations

References

Combined estrogen–androgen formulations